Kisielów may refer to the following villages in Poland:
 Kisielów, Silesian Voivodeship (south Poland)
 Kisielów, Subcarpathian Voivodeship (south-east Poland)